The 1996–97 season was Manchester United's fifth season in the Premier League, and their 22nd consecutive season in the top division of English football. United clinched the Premier League title with 75 points – placing them seven points ahead of the three teams below them; Newcastle United, Arsenal and Liverpool.

They also reached the European Cup semi-finals, bowing out to eventual winners Borussia Dortmund of Germany, after losing both legs 1–0. Earlier in the competition, they had lost at home in Europe for the first time, with a 1–0 defeat to Fenerbahçe of Turkey in the group stage. Their defence of the FA Cup ended in the Fourth Round replay with a 1–0 defeat to Wimbledon, while their bid for success in the League Cup was short-lived as they bowed out to eventual winners Leicester City in the Fourth Round.

New signing Ole Gunnar Solskjær was one of the biggest breakthrough stars in the 1996–97 Premier League season, with 19 goals in all competitions, making him the club's top goalscorer. Twenty-two-year-old midfielder David Beckham clinched the PFA Young Player of the Year award in the same season he won his first England cap. Solskjær's fellow Norwegian, Ronny Johnsen, proved himself as a fine successor to Steve Bruce in central defence, but £3.5 million Czech winger Karel Poborský failed to win a regular first team place and was one of the Premier League's biggest disappointments that season. Jordi Cruyff, son of Dutch legend Johan Cruyff, was similarly disappointing, failing to win a regular first team place despite being able to play in midfield, attack or on the left wing.

Just before the start of the season, winger Lee Sharpe left the club after eight years to sign for Leeds United in a £4.5 million deal. Earlier in the summer, captain Steve Bruce had departed to Birmingham City on a free transfer after almost a decade at Old Trafford, while Paul Parker left on a free transfer after his final two seasons at the club had been plagued by injury and the loss of his place in the team to Gary Neville.

The season ended with a major shock as Eric Cantona announced his retirement from playing, prompting manager Alex Ferguson to search for a new striker. The search ended with the £3.5 million capture of Tottenham Hotspur and England 31-year-old Teddy Sheringham.

Pre-season and friendlies

FA Charity Shield

FA Premier League

FA Cup

United beat Tottenham Hotspur 2–0 to reach the Fourth Round, where they faced Wimbledon, who they had beaten easily 3–0 on the first day of the season; the game ended 1–1. The replay was played at Wimbledon's Selhurst Park, with the game ending 1–0 to Wimbledon, knocking United out of the competition at a very early stage. In between these two FA Cup games, United and Wimbledon faced each other again in the league, with United coming out on top at home, with a 2–1 win, making it all the more shocking that Wimbledon managed to defeat them five days later in the cup.

League Cup

As in the previous two seasons, United rested many of their first-team players in the League Cup, instead using the competition to provide first team experience to the club's younger players and reserves. This proved to be a bad move, as the Red Devils just managed to squeeze past Swindon Town to get into the Fourth Round, but they were then defeated by Leicester City 2–0.

UEFA Champions League

Group stage

In the group stage, United were drawn together with defending champions Juventus of Italy, Turkish champions Fenerbahçe and Austrian champions Rapid Wien.

Knockout phase

United were drawn against Portuguese champions Porto in the quarter-finals, and sealed their place in the semi-finals with a 4–0 win in the first leg, followed by a goalless second leg. They were then drawn against the eventual winners, German champions Borussia Dortmund, who beat them 1–0 in each leg, eliminated the Red Devils from the competition 2–0 on aggregate.

Squad statistics

Transfers
United's first departure of the 1996–97 season was Hasney Aljofree, who signed for Bolton Wanderers on a free transfer on 2 July. Four days later, Heath Maxon was released. Tony Coton joined Sunderland on 12 July, while a month later, Lee Sharpe joined Leeds United after eight years at Old Trafford.

Arriving in the summer were Norwegian defender Ronny Johnsen, Czech winger Karel Poborský, Norwegian forward Ole Gunnar Solskjær, and Dutch midfielder Jordi Cruyff.

United's only winter departure was American forward Jovan Kirovski, who joined Borussia Dortmund on a free transfer on 8 December. David Fish joined Stockport County on 1 May, while a day later, David Hilton was released. Just under a fortnight later, Colin Murdock joined Preston North End, while on 18 May, Eric Cantona retired. Robert Trees was released on 30 June.

On 27 June, Teddy Sheringham was acquired from Tottenham Hotspur to replace the retired Cantona.

In

Out

Loan out

References

Manchester United F.C. seasons
Manchester United
1997